Kunzea pulchella, commonly known as granite kunzea,  is a flowering plant in the myrtle family, Myrtaceae and is endemic to the south-west of Western Australia. It is a shrub with spreading branches, egg-shaped to lance-shaped leaves and loose groups of red flowers, each on a short stalk so that the branch is visible between the flowers.

Description
Both sides of the leaves are silky-hairy.

Some forms of the plant have white to pale cream-coloured flowers. The features of this species that distinguish it from others in the Myrtaceae are the red flowers, persistent sepals and deciduous fruit. The egg-shaped leaves and triangular sepals distinguish it from Kunzea baxteri which also has red flowers.

The colour of the flowers is white in the east of the range, and pink forms occur at a north–south transition zone that includes Elachbutting, Frog Rock and Duladjin Rock. The white form may encourage pollination by nocturnal moths, supplementing the  less reliable visits by the honeyeaters in the more arid region,

Taxonomy and naming
The species was first formally described in 1839 by John Lindley, who gave it the name Salisia pulchella and published the description in A Sketch of the Vegetation of the Swan River Colony. In 1966, Alex George revised the name to Kunzea pulchella and published the change in The Western Australian Naturalist. The specific epithet (pulchella) is the diminutive of the Latin word pulcher meaning "pretty", hence "beautiful little".

Distribution and habitat
Kunzea pulchella grows in sandy or clay soils, often near or over granite in open scrub. The species occurs at the granite outcrops of Western Australia, and amongst the most common shrubs of those features in the more arid wheatbelt and goldfields areas of the southwest region. The preferred site is a narrow fissure in granite, to which it will be tenaciously anchored. The species may assume a bonsai appearance as the aging sole resident of a minor flaw on the face of a granite outcrop.

It grows over a widespread area in the Avon Wheatbelt, Coolgardie, Jarrah Forest, Mallee, Murchison and Yalgoo biogeographic regions.

Use in horticulture
This kunzea is best suited to a climate with dry summers and wet winters but can be grown in eastern Australian states if grown from cuttings on Kunzea ambigua rootstock.

Conservation
Granite kunzea is classified as "not threatened" by the Department of Parks and Wildlife of Western Australia.

References

pulchella
Endemic flora of Western Australia
Myrtales of Australia
Rosids of Western Australia
Plants described in 1839